The discography of The Weepies, an indie pop-folk band fronted by singer-songwriters Deb Talan and Steve Tannen, contains five studio albums, one extended play and six singles. The Weepies released their first album, Happiness, through an independent label. After signing with Nettwerk, they released their second album in 2006, Say I Am You. In that same year, they released a Live Session (The Weepies EP) featuring songs from "Say I Am You", four songs from Deb and Steve's previous work, and one song from their future album "Hideaway'". In 2008 they released their third studio album Hideaway. In 2010, they released their fourth studio album, Be My Thrill. In 2015, they released their fifth studio album, Sirens.

Albums

Studio albums

Extended plays

Singles

Album appearances

References

External Links
 

Discographies of American artists
Pop music group discographies